Thomas Saunders (by 1513 – 18 August 1565) was an English politician.

Family
Thomas Saunders was the third but eldest surviving son of Nicholas Saunders of Charlwood, Surrey, by Alice Hungate, the daughter of John Hungate.

Career
Saunders entered the Inner Temple in 1527. He was solicitor for the households of Queens Anne of Cleves and Catherine Howard in 1540. He sat on the bench as a Justice of the Peace for Surrey from 1541 until his death, and was appointed High Sheriff of Surrey and Sussex for 1553–54.

He was elected a Member (MP) of the Parliament of England for Gatton in 1542, Surrey in March 1553 and 1558, and Reigate in October 1553.

Saunders died 18 August 1565. His will, dated 7 March 1563, was proved 7 July 1566.

Marriage and issue
Saunders married Alice Walsingham (d. 21 May 1558), the daughter of Sir Edmund Walsingham of Scadbury, Chislehurst, Kent, by his first wife, Katherine Gounter or Gunter; they had 3 sons and 2 daughters.

Notes

References

External links
Will of Sir Thomas Saunders of Charlwood, Surrey, proved 7 July 1566, PROB 11/48/525, National Archives Retrieved 15 June 2013

1513 births
1565 deaths
Members of the Inner Temple
High Sheriffs of Surrey
High Sheriffs of Sussex
English MPs 1542–1544
English MPs 1553 (Edward VI)
English MPs 1553 (Mary I)
English MPs 1558